Capoeta alborzensis is a species of cyprinid in the genus Capoeta.

References

alborzensis
Fish described in 2016